Teddy the Dog or Keystone Teddy (1910/11 – May 17, 1925) was the most famous animal actor associated with the Mack Sennett studios. The Great Dane was one of only three (with Mabel Normand and Roscoe Arbuckle) of the studio's stars whose name appeared in the title of a film (Teddy at the Throttle). He performed chiefly in Sennett comedies, but he also appeared in dramatic films including Stella Maris (1918), The Strangers' Banquet (1922) and A Boy of Flanders (1924).

According to film crews and fellow cast members, Teddy behaved on set as professionally as any human actor. He is credited with appearing in at least 60 films, nearly all shorts, between 1915 and 1924.

He died May 17, 1925, aged 14, at Simkins' home in Hollywood.

Select filmography

See also
Luke the Dog
Pete the Pup
Jean (dog)
List of individual dogs

References and notes

External links

Dog actors